The Hong Kong Legislative Council members' oath-taking controversy was a series of events surrounding the oaths of office of a dozen pro-democracy and localist members-elect of the Legislative Council of Hong Kong (LegCo) on 12 October 2016 which have resulted in the disqualification of six members, Sixtus "Baggio" Leung and Yau Wai-ching of Youngspiration, who were unseated by the court on 15 November 2016, and Leung Kwok-hung, Nathan Law, Yiu Chung-yim and Lau Siu-lai on 14 July 2017.

The pro-democracy members-elect have used the oath-taking ceremonies at each inaugural meeting as a platform of protest since 2004, during which they have held objects or shouted slogans. On 12 October 2016, the inaugural meeting of the 6th Legislative Council, a dozen of members-elect used the occasion to protest, highlighted by the pro-independence Youngspiration legislators, Sixtus Leung and Yau Wai-ching, who asserted "as a member of the Legislative Council, I shall pay earnest efforts in keeping guard over the interests of the Hong Kong nation," displayed a "Hong Kong is not China" banner, and mispronounced "People's Republic of China" as "people's re-fucking of Chee-na". As a result, the oaths of the two, as well as that of Yiu Chung-yim, who also inserted his own words, were invalidated by the LegCo secretary-general Kenneth Chen and the oath of Lau Siu-lai, who spent about ten minutes reading the 80-word oath in extreme slow motion, was invalidated by the LegCo President Andrew Leung.

The controversy escalated when Chief Executive Leung Chun-ying and Secretary for Justice Rimsky Yuen, on 18 October, unprecedentedly launched a judicial review seeking the disqualification of Sixtus Leung and Yau Wai-ching. This was followed by the walkout staged by pro-Beijing legislators to force adjournment and block the pair and Lau Siu-lai from retaking their oaths on the following day after Yiu Chung-yim had retaken his oath. Lau Siu-lai eventually retook her oath on 2 November.

On 7 November 2016, despite the pan-democrats' opposition, the National People's Congress Standing Committee (NPCSC) controversially interpreted Article 104 of the Basic Law of Hong Kong to "clarify" the requirements that the legislators need to swear allegiance to Hong Kong as part of China when they take office, stating that a person "who intentionally reads out words which do not accord with the wording of the oath prescribed by law, or takes the oath in a manner which is not sincere or not solemn" should be barred from taking their public office and cannot retake the oath. As a consequence, the court disqualified Sixtus Leung and Yau Wai-ching on 15 November. The oaths of a dozen of pro-democracy legislators and a few pro-Beijing legislators were also under legal challenges.

On 2 December 2016, the government launched a second legal action against four more pro-democracy legislators, Leung Kwok-hung of the League of Social Democrats, Nathan Law of Demosistō, Yiu Chung-yim and Lau Siu-lai, over their manners at the oath-taking ceremony. As a result, the four legislators were disqualified by the court on 14 July 2017.

Background

According to Article 104 of the Basic Law of Hong Kong, members of the Legislative Council must swear to uphold the Basic Law and swear allegiance to the Hong Kong Special Administrative Region of the People's Republic of China. According to the Oaths and Declarations Ordinance, the Legislative Council oath is:

The oath of office ceremony of the Legislative Council of Hong Kong (LegCo) has been the platform of protest of some pro-democracy legislators since 2004, when radical democrat legislator Leung Kwok-hung shouted the slogan "Long live democracy! Long live the people!" before and after delivering the oath in full at the inaugural meeting of the 3rd Legislative Council; Leung's oath at that time was validated by the clerk of the Legislative Council Ricky Fung. Leung kept his practice of protesting at the each oath-taking ceremony and this practice was followed by some other pan-democrats.

In 2012, People Power legislator Wong Yuk-man skipped key words in the oath by coughing at strategic moments when taking the oath and his oath was invalidated by LegCo President Jasper Tsang. He was allowed to retake his oath during the next meeting. Even though he read out part of his second oath in a different tone of voice and shouted "Down with the Hong Kong communist regime, down with Leung Chun-ying" after completing the oath, and was challenged by pro-Beijing legislator Paul Tse for taking the oath in this way, the oath was accepted by the President.

In the 2016 Legislative Council election held on 4 September 2016, six localist candidates with different agendas striving for the "self-determination" of Hong Kong were elected with 19 percent of the total votes even though the Electoral Affairs Commission (EAC) had made the unprecedented move to disqualify six other localist nominees (including Hong Kong Indigenous' Edward Leung, who ran in the February's New Territories East by-election) as candidates of the election on the grounds that they supported Hong Kong independence. Leung campaigned for Youngspiration's Sixtus Leung, 30, who stood in the same constituency as a "back up" plan. Leung was duly elected with 37,997 votes. His party colleague, Yau Wai-ching, 25, also won the last seat in Kowloon West with 20,643 votes, becoming the youngest female to be elected to the legislature.

Course of events

Oaths invalidated
On 11 October 2016, a day before the inaugural session of the 6th Legislative Council, the government issued a statement warning the members-elect of the Legislative Council to swear to uphold the Basic Law and swear allegiance to the Hong Kong Special Administrative Region of the People's Republic of China as required by the Article 104 of the Basic Law.

On 12 October 2016, five localist and eight pro-democrat legislators used the oath-taking ceremony as a platform of protest as they had in the previous sessions, by either shouting slogans or making extra statements before or after taking their oaths. Leung Kwok-hung of the League of Social Democrats (LSD), who had used the oath-taking ceremony as a platform of protest since 2004, held a yellow umbrella symbolising the Umbrella Revolution with many words thereon, including "ending one-party rule", and a paper board showing the words "NPC 831 decision" and a cross on it. He paused many times while reading the oath and tore a piece of paper with the words "NPC 831 decision". Newcomers such as Nathan Law of Demosistō had raised his tone when swearing allegiance to China, sounding like he was asking a question, while Lau Siu-lai paused for six seconds in between every word in order to, she said, make the oath meaningless.

However, the oaths of the independent pan-democrat Yiu Chung-yim, Youngspiration's Sixtus Leung and Yau Wai-ching were invalidated by LegCo secretary-general Kenneth Chen. Yiu added phrases such as "universal suffrage" immediately after his oath. Leung and Yau pledged allegiance to the "Hong Kong nation" before they took the oath while displaying a banner that read "Hong Kong is not China". They also pronounced "People's Republic of China" as "people's re-fucking of Chee-na", a variation of the term Shina, which was used by Japan to refer to China and was deemed derogatory since the Second World War, three times. The three oaths were declared invalid, with the effect that the trio could not vote in the subsequent election of the LegCo President, in which Andrew Leung of the Business and Professionals Alliance for Hong Kong (BPA) was controversially elected.

Condemnation
The Hong Kong SAR government denounced the duo for modifying their oaths and hurting the feelings of Chinese people, labelling their actions as "in violation of the dignity expected of LegCo members, or even spoke or acted in an offensive manner that harmed the feelings of our compatriots." Chief Executive Leung Chun-ying said many people were "angry and disappointed" over the oath-taking process. "This seriously affects the feelings between Hong Kong and mainland people," he added. China's state media Xinhua quoted a "person-in-charge" of the Central People's Government's Liaison Office in Hong Kong on 14 October as expressing "strong anger and condemnation" over the two legislators' "despicable words and actions" which "has challenged the nation's dignity and severely hurt the feelings of all Chinese people and overseas Chinese, including Hong Kong compatriots."

Sixtus Leung blamed his "Ap Lei Chau accent" as the reason of his pronunciation of "China" as "Chee-na" and the alleged profanity. He also argued that the word "Chee-na" is not offensive as "Dr Sun Yat-sen used the term 'Chee-na' when he was lobbying overseas." He also argued that the "Hong Kong is not China" slogan was a factual statement, "just like 'apple is not orange'." His action and explanation were attacked in an opinion article written for South China Morning Post as "kindergarten-like". A group of Ap Lei Chau residents issued a joint statement rejecting his excuse, saying that "[Sixtus] Leung Chung-hang's terrible action has made those of us who were born and bred in Ap Lei Chau angry."

On the other hand, secretary-general Kenneth Chen's decision to invalidate the three legislators' oaths was questioned. "Secretary-general ruled the oaths as invalid without consulting legal advice," Lau Siu-lai, elected on her platform for self-determination, said. "It was an unjust decision and the subsequent meeting, in which the president was elected, was therefore unlawful." The pro-Beijing camp, on the other hand, sent a petition to the LegCo president asking him to also invalidate the oaths of Nathan Law and Lau Siu-lai. Lau's oath was later invalidated by President Andrew Leung on 18 October along with that of pro-Beijing Democratic Alliance for the Betterment and Progress of Hong Kong (DAB) legislator Wong Ting-kwong (who missed the words "Hong Kong" when reading the oath) after Leung consulted lawyers. The five legislators would be allowed to retake their oaths at the next meeting on 19 October.

On 17 October, Sixtus Leung said he and Yau Wai-ching would consider compromising by retaking their oaths properly on the next meeting on 19 October to keep their seats, but both insisted they had done nothing wrong and brushed off mounting calls for an apology and their resignation, as well as threats of legal action against them. They claimed that the word "Chee-na" was referring to the regime but not to the people or culture.

Various pro-Beijing and Beijing-friendly organisations ran more than a dozen adverts in local newspapers, urging the duo to apologise or even resign, including one statement issued by more than 200 historians and educators, including former chief curator of the Hong Kong History Museum Joseph Ting Sun-pao.

Government's legal action

On 18 October night, just hours before the next LegCo meeting, the Hong Kong government took the unprecedented step of mounting a legal challenge to disqualify two Youngspiration legislators on grounds that their actions in the oath-taking process had contravened the Basic Law. Johnny Mok Shiu-luen, SC, representing Chief Executive Leung Chun-ying and Secretary for Justice Rimsky Yuen accused the duo of "sending a message to the world and also to the public that we can function as a member of LegCo without pledging allegiance to the HKSAR of the People's Republic of China," Mok said. Jat Sew-tong, SC, acting for LegCo President Andrew Leung argued that the government's move was a "serious deprivation of the constitutional rights" of the two legislators-elect. Justice Thomas Au Hing-cheung allowed the government's application for a judicial review, but denied the government an interim injunction to bar the pair from retaking their oaths on the next meeting. The hearing on the application was set for 3 November.

The pan-democracy camp accused Leung Chun-ying of "ruining the separation of powers" by inviting the courts to intervene in LegCo's domestic affairs. "The Chief executive pays no respect to the dignity and the independence of our legislature," Civic Party legislator for Legal constituency Dennis Kwok said. Rita Fan, Hong Kong delegate to the Standing Committee of the National People's Congress and Maria Tam, member of the Basic Law Committee under the Standing Committee slammed the pan-democrats back, denying the existence of the separation of powers in the Basic Law. Fan said the Basic Law "makes no mention" of separation of powers, while Tam said separation of powers was not how Hong Kong's political structure was defined.

Pro-Beijing camp's walkout
Paul Tse, a pro-Beijing independent legislator suggested staging a walkout to force adjournment and block the two Youngspiration legislators from retaking their oaths if they did not apologise. Four pro-Beijing lawmakers, including Holden Chow and Priscilla Leung, disagreed, saying a forced adjournment would be damaging to LegCo. However, after the court's ruling, the pro-Beijing camp decided to stage the walkout at the second meeting of the Legislative Council on 19 October after Wong Ting-kwong and Yiu Chung-yim retook their oaths. Sixtus Leung, Yau Wai-ching, as well as Lau Siu-lai, who were supposed to retake the oath after Yiu, were unable to do so.

New People's Party chairwoman Regina Ip denied that the pro-Beijing camp and the government were buying time, although some legislators admitted that the administration's judicial review had indeed prompted them to take the step. She was quoted as arguing that such a move would cost them public support, "but why couldn't we do something when even the government has made such a move? We do not want to appear feebler than the administration". LegCo President Andrew Leung said it was "unfortunate" his colleagues chose to walk out and that he had no choice but to adjourn the meeting.

After the walkout, as pro-Beijing lawmakers met the media, explaining the rationale behind their action, radical democrat legislator "Long Hair" Leung Kwok-hung of the League of Social Democrats (LSD) threw luncheon meat at them in protest. Luncheon meat has been a symbol against filibusters in LegCo after former pro-Beijing legislator Wong Kwok-hing of the Hong Kong Federation of Trade Unions (FTU) measured the cost of long debates in terms of the amount of luncheon meat that could have been bought instead of paying the legislators.

LegCo's democratic caucus convenor Democratic Party's James To said the pro-Beijing members "blatantly adjourned the meeting with the use of rules of procedures to block lawmakers from retaking their oaths". Democrat Lam Cheuk-ting, who had originally planned to petition at the meeting setting up a select committee to investigate HK$50 million Chief executive Leung Chun-ying received from Australian engineering firm UGL Limited, accused the pro-Beijing camp of helping the Chief executive. Civic Party legislator Dennis Kwok said the walkout was a huge blow to the city's rule of law, and disrespectful to the court system as the court had refused to grant an injunction preventing the Youngspiration pair from retaking their oaths.

After the pro-Beijing legislators walked out, localist Civic Passion's Cheng Chung-tai was seen turning the flags of China and Hong Kong, which DAB's Lau Kwok-fan had brought into the chamber, upside down. DAB's Chan Hak-kan said Cheng's act was against the law. Lau subsequently reported Cheng to the police and urged them to investigate and prosecute in accordance with the law.

LegCo President's on-hold decision

On 25 October, LegCo President Andrew Leung took a U-turn by deciding to delay the oath-taking of Sixtus Leung and Yau Wai-ching on Wednesday's general meeting on 26 October, six hours after Chief executive Leung Chun-ying warned of "far-reaching repercussions" on the relationship between Hong Kong and the mainland should the matter not be "rectified". Leung cited Article 72 of the Basic Law which allows the LegCo president to decide on the agenda, even though according to Rule 18 of LegCo's rules of procedures, oath-taking is designated as the first priority of the order of LegCo's business. "I note with grave concern the intention of the pro-establishment lawmakers to forestall the [oath-taking] at all costs," Andrew Leung explained. If he let Sixtus Leung and Yau retake the oaths on 26 October, "the most probable outcome is that LegCo will come to a complete halt", as the pro-Beijing camp had threatened a second walkout to block the duo from retaking their oaths. The Youngspiration pair slammed the president for what they called a "ridiculous" reversal of his earlier decision.

On 26 October, despite Andrew Leung's ban on the two Youngspiration members entering the LegCo chamber citing Rule 1 of LegCo's rules of procedures, the duo successfully entered the chamber, escorted by at least eight pan-democracy legislators and surrounded by reporters. Andrew Leung immediately asked Sixtus Leung and Yau Wai-ching to leave when he entered the chamber. After a short suspension of the meeting, Civic Passion's Cheng Chung-tai shouted at Andrew Leung, asking him to explain why he did not allow the duo to take their oath. Leung asked Cheng to leave the premises with Sixtus Leung and Yau. All three refused. After few minutes, Andrew Leung announced the meeting to be adjourned.

The pro-democracy camp call on Andrew Leung to resign after the adjournment. "Andrew Leung is unfit to perform his role," the camp's convenor James To said. "The quorum was met, but he did not administer the oath [for the duo] in accordance with the law. In the face of the chaos, he did not know what to do but to adjourn the meeting. He has no basic competence to chair the meeting." The pro-Beijing camp blamed the adjournment on the pro-democrats. "People might have different interpretations of the rules of procedures, but they should respect the final ruling of the LegCo president," Regina Ip of the New People's Party said, referring to Andrew Leung's earlier decision to ban the Youngspiration pair from entering the chamber. Felix Chung, leader of the Liberal Party said the city was in a "constitutional crisis" as the legislature could not function at all.

On 2 November, the fourth general meeting was adjourned again after the two Youngspiration legislators Yau Wai-ching and Sixtus Leung stormed into the main chamber and tried to take the oaths on themselves after another localist Lau Siu-lai, who was not under legal challenge, successfully retook her oath. President Andrew Leung relocated the meeting to another conference room where the duo attempted to enter. Six security guards were injured and police was called before the meeting was adjourned.

Interpretation of the Basic Law 
Two days before the court hearing, Chief Executive Leung Chun-ying said he could not rule out asking Beijing to interpret the Basic Law on the oath-taking row on 1 November. On 3 November in the court hearing, Benjamin Yu SC, counsel for the Chief Executive and the Secretary for Justice, argued that the constitutional provision requiring legislators to duly take the oath as stipulated in the Article 104 of the Basic Law "is at stake" and therefore the court should intervene. Hectar Pun Hei SC for Sixtus Leung and Philip Dykes SC for Yau Wai-ching argued that the Basic Law provides for a separation of powers in which the oath-taking controversy should be resolved by the Legislative Council itself through a "political process" rather than a judicial process. Justice Thomas Au Hing-cheung said he would deliver his ruling "as soon as practicable" in the light of the possibility of the interpretation of the Basic Law by the National People's Congress Standing Committee (NPCSC).

On 4 November, Maria Tam, a member of the Basic Law Committee of the NPCSC, confirmed that the committee had received a letter from Zhang Dejiang, chairman of the National People's Congress, who said Basic Law Article 104 would be interpreted and that committee members' views would be sought. A Hong Kong government spokesman also said it had been notified by the central government that an item relating to interpreting Article 104 of the Basic Law had been put on the agenda of the NPCSC. Civic Party's Dennis Kwok for the Legal constituency warned the interpretation would deal a huge blow to Hong Kong's rule of law. The Hong Kong Bar Association said it was "deeply concerned" about the reports of the interpretation of the Basic Law earlier, saying it would "deal a severe blow to the independence of the judiciary and the power of final adjudication of the Hong Kong court", if the NPCSC insisted on interpreting the Basic Law before the court's final ruling. "It will also seriously undermine the confidence of the Hong Kong people and the international community in the high degree of autonomy of [Hong Kong]," it said.

On 6 November, between 8,000 (police figures) and 13,000 people (according to the rally organisers) protested against the interpretation of the Basic Law. Police used pepper spray to disperse protesters outside the Central Government's Liaison Office in Sai Ying Pun. Subsequently, Demosistō, Student Fight for Democracy, the League of Social Democrats and the Labour Party announced the demonstration was over and urged protesters to depart to "avoid sacrifice" in face of the "unfavourable situation". From 2 am, a squad of about 40 officers deployed with batons actively chased after protesters from Wilmer Street to Bonham Strand West to disperse those remaining. Four people were arrested and two police officers injured during the clash.

On 7 November, the NPCSC unanimously passed "The National People's Congress Standing Committee's interpretation of the Basic Law Article 104 of the Hong Kong Special Administrative Region". Under the interpretation, the person taking the LegCo member's oath should take it in a sincere and solemn manner with accurate, complete and solemn phrases such as "uphold the Basic Law of the Hong Kong Special Administrative Region of the People's Republic of China" and "bear allegiance to the Hong Kong Special Administrative Region of the People's Republic of China" as stated in the statutory text of the oath. If the oath-taker refuses to take the oath or otherwise deliberately fails to take it in the correct way, he or she cannot retake the oath and shall be disqualified from assuming public office. It also stated that the oath administrator has the duty to confirm if the oath-taking is carried out legally and complies with this interpretation and Hong Kong law. The spokesman of the Hong Kong and Macau Affairs Office stated that "[Beijing] will absolutely neither permit anyone advocating secession in Hong Kong nor allow any pro-independence activists to enter a government institution."

Following Beijing's decision, Chief Executive Leung Chun-ying said Hong Kong would enact Article 23, a controversial provision of the Basic Law relating to national security legislation. On 8 November, hundreds of lawyers joined a silent march against Beijing's interpretation of the Basic Law, claiming it harms judicial independence. Mainland legal scholar and Hong Kong adviser Jiang Shigong responded to criticism of the interpretation by lawyers in Hong Kong by invoking the doctrine of necessity in common law.

First wave of disqualifications
On 15 November 2016, Justice Thomas Au Hing-cheung, Justice of the High Court ruled that the two Youngspiration legislators should lose their seats as their conduct during 12 October oath-taking meant they had declined to take their oaths. The judge also ruled that Legislative Council President Andrew Leung had no power to arrange a second oath-taking for the pair, adding that he had made his conclusions independently of the NPCSC interpretation.

On 30 November 2016, the Court of Appeal (Cheung CJHC, Lam VP, and Poon JA) unanimously rejected the appeals by the duo, referring to Beijing's interpretation as giving the "true meaning" to the part of the Basic Law. Chief Judge Andrew Cheung held that:"The interpretation specifically sets out the consequence of an oath taker's declining to take the relevant oath – automatic disqualification, as part of the true meaning of Article 104 [...] The principle of nonintervention cannot prevent the court from adjudicating on the consequence of a failure to meet the constitutional requirement [...] There can be no dispute that both Leung and Yau have declined respectively to take the [Legislative Council] Oath. What has been done was done deliberately and intentionally [...] As a matter of law and fact, Leung and Yau have failed the constitutional requirement. They are caught by paragraph 2(3) of the Interpretation as well as section 21 of the Ordinance which gives effect to the constitutional requirement. Under the former, they were automatically disqualified forthwith from assuming their offices. Under the latter, they "shall ... vacate [their respective offices]." There is therefore no question of allowing them to retake the LegCo Oath."The interpretation also affected several other judicial reviews subsequently filed by supporters of the pro-Beijing camp targeting about a dozen legislators who added words to the prescribed oath to make a political statement. Judicial reviews targeting pro-Beijing legislators were also filed, namely LegCo President Andrew Leung, Regina Ip and Lo Wai-kwok who once pledged allegiance to the United Kingdom and the Queen as a British national or colonial government official during British rule over Hong Kong. Pro-democrats Chan Chi-chuen of People Power, Leung Kwok-hung of the League of Social Democrats, Cheng Chung-tai of Civic Passion, nonpartisans Shiu Ka-chun, Yiu Chung-yim, Lau Siu-lai and Eddie Chu, Demosistō's Nathan Law, Democrats Andrew Wan, Lam Cheuk-ting, Helena Wong, and Roy Kwong, and the Labour Party's Fernando Cheung also faced judicial reviews.

On 25 August 2017, Chief Justice Geoffrey Ma and permanent judges Robert Ribeiro and Joseph Fok of the Court of Final Appeal rejected a final bid by Sixtus Leung and Yau Wai-ching.

Second wave of disqualifications

On 2 December 2016 Chief Executive Leung Chun-ying and the Secretary for Justice Rimsky Yuen lodged another judicial review against four more pro-democracy legislators over their oaths, Lau Siu-lai, Nathan Law, Leung Kwok-hung and Yiu Chung-yim, who were already under legal challenge filed by pro-Beijing supporters.

On 14 July 2017, the court ruled the four pro-democracy legislators were to lose their seats. Judge Thomas Au found that the oaths of Leung, Law and Yiu were invalid as they added statements before and after the oaths and for Lau, she took such long pauses between the words that the oath lost its meaning. Au also said "politics and political arguments" did not feature in his decision. Law's party, Demosistō issued a statement saying that with a total of six legislators ejected to date, "more than 180,000 voters had their voices silenced." The pro-democracy camp also lost its majority in the geographical constituencies as a result, dropping from 17 to 14 seats out of 35 seats, and lost the power to block pro-Beijing legislators' motions and bill amendments, including amendments to rule of procedures to block radical democrats' filibustering.

In March 2017, Lo King-yeung, a Lai King resident mounted legal action against two more legislators, Cheng Chung-tai of the Civic Passion and Eddie Chu who had also added words to their oaths. As Lo failed to promptly pay a deposit to start the case on time, High Court Judge Thomas Au Hing-cheung refused to let him make the late payment on 31 July, meaning the lawsuit could not proceed. It also marked the end of the all lawsuits relating to the oath-taking controversy.

Councillor oath with suspected violations

Indirectly caused disputes in the 2016 Macau Legislative Council Election Law 

The new election rules stipulate that candidates should not carry out activities that could influence voters in the two-month period between their registration and the start of the campaign period on August 31. Commercial advertising is barred from most public areas, except those specially designated by the government.

After an interpretation of the Basic Law, the Macau EAC carried out a new election measure to require that all candidates sign an additional "confirmation form" in their nomination of their understanding of the Basic Law of Macau.

See also

 2016 Mong Kok civil unrest
 6th Legislative Council of Hong Kong
 Charles Bradlaugh
 2018 Hong Kong by-election
 Hong Kong independence
 Hong Kong LegCo candidates' disqualification controversy
 2016 Hong Kong legislative election
 Localism in Hong Kong

Notes

References

External links
 Full text: Interpretation of Article 104 of Basic Law of Hong Kong SAR
 Rules of Procedure of the Legislative Council of the Hong Kong Special Administrative Region
 

2016 in Hong Kong
2017 in Hong Kong
Oaths
Politics of Hong Kong
Political repression in Hong Kong